Lourdes Angélica Vega Acosta Montalban (also known as Lourdes de Vargas) is a retired Mexican rheologist who, in 1986, with José Manuel Tejero Andrade, cofounded the Laboratory of Rheology and Physics of Soft Matter at the Instituto Politécnico Nacional.

Vega Acosta Montalban earned her Ph.D. in 1979 at the University of Wisconsin–Madison with the dissertation In-line elasticity measurements in polymer melts. She is a member of the Mexican Academy of Sciences. She retired between 2006 and 2015.

References

Year of birth missing (living people)
Living people
Rheologists
Mexican scientists
Mexican women scientists
University of Wisconsin–Madison alumni
Academic staff of the Instituto Politécnico Nacional
Members of the Mexican Academy of Sciences